is a Buddhist temple of the Shingon sect located in Ōsu, in central Nagoya, Japan. It belongs to the Owari Thirty-three Kannon.

History 
The official name is Kitanosan Shinpuku-ji Hōshō-in, but is popularly known as Ōsu Kannon.

The temple was originally built in about the year 1333 in Ōsu-gō, Nagaoka village, in Owari Province, which is currently known as the city of Hashima in Gifu Prefecture. Construction was sponsored by the Emperor Go-Daigo, who appointed Shōnin Nōshin as the first head priest. Nōshin had a dream of Avalokitesvara, the Buddha of Compassion, known as Kannon in Japanese.
Hence, the name Ōsu (from Ōsu-gō) Kannon. Due to repeated flooding, the temple was moved to its present location in 1612 by Tokugawa Ieyasu. In the 1820s, large parts of the temple were destroyed by fire, but it was rebuilt in the 1970s. The main hall has a very large, red paper lantern hanging from the ceiling where worshipers can tie small paper notes with wishes to the holding wires.

Library 
The current temple is home to a large collection of books. It houses about 15,000 classic Japanese and Chinese works. The Records of Ancient Matters (古事記 Kojiki), a Shinpukuji manuscript (真福寺本) transcribed by the monk Ken'yu (賢瑜) is the oldest extant manuscript of the Kojiki and consists of three books that were written in 1371–1372 during the Nanboku-chō period. It describes the ancient mythological history of Japan. The library also has many other books designated as national treasures and important cultural properties.

Market 
A street fair is held on the 18th day of each month. A number of antiques are sold there. 

The nearest subway is Ōsu Kannon Station.

See also 
 Hongan-ji Nagoya Betsuin, a temple nearby

References

Sources 
Pictures of the temple
Japan-guide.com
Expo2005.or.jp

External links 

 Homepage of Ōsu Kannon

Buddhist temples in Nagoya
Ōsu